Timecode may refer to:
Timecode, a sequence of numeric codes generated at regular time intervals
Timecode (1997 film), the second skateboarding film released by Alien Workshop
Timecode (2000 film), an experimental film directed by Mike Figgis
Timecode (2016 film), a live-action Spanish short film